This is a list of all episodes from the series The L Word which aired from January 18, 2004 to March 8, 2009. With the exception of the pilot episode, all episode titles begin with the letter L. A total of 70 episodes aired over six seasons.

Series overview

Episodes

Season 1 (2004)

Season 2 (2005)

Season 3 (2006)

Season 4 (2007)

Season 5 (2008)

Season 6 (2009)

External links
 

L Word
L Word
L Word
episodes